The following highways are numbered 7C:

United States
 Nebraska Highway 7C (former)
 New York State Route 7C (former)
 County Route 7C (Allegany County, New York)
 Oklahoma State Highway 7C